Bothamsall is a civil parish in the Bassetlaw District of Nottinghamshire, England.  The parish contains nine listed buildings that are recorded in the National Heritage List for England.  All the listed buildings are designated at Grade II, the lowest of the three grades, which is applied to "buildings of national importance and special interest".  The parish contains the village of Bothamsall and the surrounding countryside.  The listed buildings consist of a country house, smaller houses and cottages, farmhouses, a church and a bridge.


Buildings

References

Citations

Sources

 

Lists of listed buildings in Nottinghamshire